Alfred Ernest Priest (24 July 1875  – 5 May 1922) was a professional footballer from the North East of England who won the 1899 and 1902 FA Cup finals with Sheffield United.

Playing career
Priest was born in Guisborough and played for Darlington and South Bank before joining Sheffield United in 1896. He made his debut for The Blades in the Football League First Division in the 1896–97 season, playing mainly as outside left, and helped United win the Football League championship in 1897-98. That same year Priest was also in the United side that suffered a huge F A cup upset at Port Vale.

After his career in football ended, he remained in Hartlepool becoming a publican until his death on 5 May 1922.

References

External links

England profile

1875 births
1922 deaths
People from Guisborough
Association football forwards
English footballers
England international footballers
Darlington F.C. players
South Bank F.C. players
Sheffield United F.C. players
Middlesbrough F.C. players
Hartlepool United F.C. players
English Football League players
English football managers
Hartlepool United F.C. managers
FA Cup Final players